Mannophryne trujillensis is an endangered amphibian species.  It is a type of fingered poison frog and is a member of the Aromabatide family. It is native to Cordillera de Mérida, Venezuela. It needs constant access to water and differs from other similar species because it features a combination of morphological features.

References

trujillensis